Fort Walton Beach, often referred to by the initialism FWB, a city in southern Okaloosa County, Florida. As of the 2020 U.S. census, the population was 20,922, up from 19,507 in 2010. It is the principal city of the Fort Walton Beach−Crestview−Destin Metropolitan Statistical Area.

Fort Walton Beach is a year-round fishing and beach resort community. Its busiest time of the year is the summer, causing a boost to the local economy because of seasonal human migration.

History

Prehistoric settlement of Fort Walton Beach is attributed to the mound building "Fort Walton Culture" that flourished from approximately 1100–1550 CE. It is believed that this culture evolved out of the Weeden Island culture. Fort Walton also appeared to come about due to contact with the major Mississippian centers to the north and west. It was the most complex in the north-west Florida region. The Fort Walton peoples put into practice mound building and intensive agriculture, made pottery in a variety of vessel shapes, and had hierarchical settlement patterns that reflected other Mississippian societies.

The first Europeans to set foot in what is now Okaloosa County and the Fort Walton Beach area were members of Álvar Núñez Cabeza de Vaca's party, who traveled by boat from what is now Panama City Beach, Florida in 1528 to Texas, "Then we set out to sea again, coasting towards the River of Palms. Every day our thirst and hunger increased because our supplies were giving out, as well as the water supply, for the pouches we had made from the legs of our horses soon became rotten and useless. From time to time we would enter some inlet or cove that reached very far inland, but we found them all shallow and dangerous, and so we navigated through them for thirty days, meeting sometimes Indians who fished and were poor and wretched people".

The area is described at "40 deaths a day" in a Spanish map dated 1566. In later English and French maps the area was noted as "Baya Santa Rosa" or "Bay St. Rose". A number of Spanish artifacts, including a portion of brigantine leather armor, are housed in the Indian Temple Mound Museum.

Contrary to popular belief, there is no documentary evidence of pirates using the area as a base of operations. Piracy was rampant in the Gulf of Mexico from pirates working out of Hispaniola, the Caribbean, and the Florida Keys. Notable raids occurred in 1683 and 1687 against the Spanish fort at San Marcos de Apalachee (by French and English buccaneers), a 1712 raid against Port Dauphin (now Alabama) by English pirates from Martinique, and the actions of the late 18th-century adventurer William Augustus Bowles, who was based in Apalachicola. Bowles was never referred to as "Billy Bowlegs" in period documentation; his Creek name was "Estajoca".

During the era of Spanish and English colonization, the area of what was to become Fort Walton Beach was noted in several journals but no worthwhile presence was established.

Early settlers of Walton County, Florida were the first to establish permanent settlements in what is now Fort Walton Beach (the area was originally named "Anderson"). Two of the first settlers were John Anderson and Andrew Alvarez, who received land plots in 1838. The name "Anderson" is noted on maps from 1838 to 1884. It was not until 1911 that the name "Camp Walton" appeared on Florida maps.

In 1861, Camp Walton was a Confederate Army camp, a fortified post, made up of the "Walton Guards", an independent Company  of Florida Volunteer Infantry from Walton County. At this time, Okaloosa County did not yet exist. Walton County received its name from Col. George Walton, who served as secretary of West Florida during Andrew Jackson's governorship (1821–1822) and whose father, George Walton Sr., was the 56th signatory of the Declaration of Independence. As a result of Col. Walton's Zavrie in the politics ofb Is north-west Florida, his Hot name was honored by establishing Walton County.

Camp Walton was located between the Indian Temple Mound, now known as the Heritage Park and Cultural Center, and the Santa Rosa Sound, its mission was to protect the "Narrows" from Union ships. Although the "Walton Guards" did not see much action, they did keep busy by digging up prehistoric Indian remains buried in the Indian Temple Mound and displaying them at camp. The post was abandoned in August 1862, and the "Walton Guards" were assigned to reinforce the 1st Florida Infantry Regiment, with duty in the Western Theatre on the Tennessee front.

On April 11, 1879,  John Thomas Brooks purchased at a public auction in Milton, Florida, 111 acres in Section 24, Township 2, Range 24 of Santa Rosa County, a portion of the property of Henry Penny whose heirs had failed to pay the taxes on the estate. This parcel on the Santa Rosa Sound became what is now downtown Fort Walton Beach.

The United States Post Office changed the official name on their cancellations from Camp Walton to Fort Walton on 1 March 1932.

The 1940 census counted 90 residents in Fort Walton. Fort Walton was incorporated  by a  state senate bill effective June 16, 1941.

The community's name was officially changed from Fort Walton to Fort Walton Beach on June 15, 1953, by agreement with the state legislature in Tallahassee, and incorporated a portion of Santa Rosa Island formerly known as Tower Beach. Tower Beach, named for a tall observation tower at the site which was later destroyed by a hurricane, had been an amusement area operated from 1928 by the Island Amusement Company by future-Fort Walton Beach mayor Thomas E. Brooks, with a board walk, casino, restaurant, dance pavilion, "40 modernly equipped beach cottages", and concession stands which was largely destroyed by fire on Saturday, March 7, 1942. Wartime supply restrictions prevented a reconstruction.  This 875-acre parcel of Santa Rosa Island with three miles of Gulf frontage was conveyed to Okaloosa County on July 8, 1950, in an informal ceremony at the county courthouse in Crestview, Florida. The county paid the federal government $4,000 to complete the transaction, the result of the efforts of Congressman Bob Sikes. The portion of Santa Rosa Island transferred is now known as Okaloosa Island. The remaining Tower Beach summer cottages were removed after the 1955 tourist season as the new Okaloosa Island Authority redeveloped the site with a new hotel and casino.   The government was changed to a city manager form.

A special census conducted in 1956 listed 9,456 residents, which grew to 11,249 by 1960.

The last of three county-owned buildings on Okaloosa Island was torn down on May 31, 1995. The buildings had originally housed the Okaloosa Island Authority and more recently the Okaloosa County Council on Aging. The 1.3-acre tract on the north side of Santa Rosa Boulevard was sold.

Geography
Fort Walton Beach is located at  (30.420199, −86.616727).

Climate
Fort Walton Beach experiences hot and very humid summers, generally from late May to mid-September. Autumns, from mid-September to early December, are generally warm. Winters are very short and mild, from mid-December to late February. Springs are warm, from late February to late May.

Fort Walton Beach averages 55.35 inches of rain each year. The wettest season is summer and the driest season is autumn, although flood season continues into autumn.

Snow and freezing rain are very rare. Freezing rain occurs about once every 5 to 10 years. Snow occurs about once every 10 to 15 years. The most recent report of a trace of snow was on January 28, 2014. The last report of freezing rain was on February 11, 2010.

The Köppen climate classification subtype for this climate is humid subtropical climate (Cfa),

Transportation

Airports
Nearby Destin-Fort Walton Beach Airport (airport code VPS) serves Fort Walton Beach, as well as Valparaiso, Florida. Airlines that currently serve Destin-Fort Walton Beach Airport are Allegiant Airlines, American Eagle, Delta Air Lines, and Delta Connection. They provide non-stop service to Atlanta, Cincinnati, Charlotte, Dallas, Fort Lauderdale, Houston, Las Vegas, Knoxville, Memphis, Oklahoma City, and St. Louis.

Okaloosa County Transit  provides public transportation throughout Fort Walton Beach as well as Okaloosa County. Its main stop and transfer location is Uptown Station located on State Road 85, a little over 1 mile north of US 98.

Major highways
State Road 189 is a north–south highway from State Road 85 to US 98 in downtown Fort Walton Beach. State Road 85 is a north–south highway that leads north  to Crestview, the Okaloosa County seat (also along Interstate 10), and ends at US 98 in downtown Fort Walton Beach. US 98 is an east–west highway, which runs through downtown Fort Walton Beach. The Brooks Bridge over the Santa Rosa Sound connects downtown Fort Walton Beach with Okaloosa Island, which is along the route of US 98. US 98 leads east  to Destin and west  to Pensacola.

Demographics

In the census of 2010, there were 19,507 people, 8,460 households, and 5,419 families residing in the city. The racial makeup of the city was 77.7% White, 12.3% African American, 0.7% Native American, 3.2% Asian, 0.03% Pacific Islander, 1.22% from other races, and 3.7% from two or more races. Hispanic or Latino of any race were 7.9% of the population.

There were 8,162 households, of which 26% had children under the age of 18 living with them, 47.3% were married couples living together, 12.6% had a female householder with no husband present, and 35.9% were non-families. 28.5% of all households were made up of individuals, and 9.6% had someone living alone who was aged 65 or older. The average household size was 2.33, and the average family size was 2.36.

In the city, the population was spread out, with 22.4% under the age of 18, 8.9% from 18 to 24, 29.3% from 25 to 44, 23.1% from 45 to 64, and 16.3% who were 65 years of age or older. The median age was 39 years. For every 100 females, there were 96.2 males. For every 100 females age 18 and over, there were 94.5 males.

The median income for a household in the city was $40,153, and the median income for a family was $45,791. Males had a median income of $29,709 versus $21,641 for females. The per capita income for the city was $21,085. About 7.3% of families and 9.9% of the population were below the poverty line, including 16.2% of those under age 18 and 4.1% of those aged 65 or over.

Notable people
 John C. Acton, retired United States Coast Guard rear admiral who serves as the director of operations coordination for DHS
 Aric Almirola, NASCAR driver with three Cup Series wins
 Glen Coffee, running back for Alabama Crimson Tide and in NFL; San Francisco 49ers drafted Coffee with 74th overall pick of 2009 NFL draft
 Richard Covey, astronaut
 Bud Day, retired U.S. Air Force colonel, Marine Corps, Army and Air Force veteran, Vietnam prisoner of war, Medal of Honor and Air Force Cross recipient
 Jason Elam, NFL kicker, two-time Super Bowl champion with Denver Broncos
 Scott Fletcher, MLB baseball infielder
 Scott Frank, screenwriter
 Matt Gaetz, current U.S. representative from Florida's 1st congressional district
 Shane Gibson, internationally known heavy metal guitarist, most notable as touring guitarist for Korn
 E. G. Green, NFL wide receiver, Indianapolis Colts
 D. J. Hall, Alabama and NFL wide receiver
 Edward L. Hubbard, retired Air Force officer, author, artist, motivational speaker and Vietnam Prisoner of War
 Nancy Kenaston, journalist, public relations director, court reporter at Nuremberg trials
 Rick Malambri, actor
 Brian Marshall, bass player for rock bands Creed and Alter Bridge
 Demetria McKinney, actress
 Maurice McLaughlin, politician
 Lonnie R. Moore, Korean War Double Ace
 Matt Moore, pitcher for the Texas Rangers
 Carolyn Murphy, internationally acclaimed model (born in Panama City, Florida)
 Preston Shumpert, basketball player, Syracuse forward and guard
 Akeem Spence, NFL (Miami Dolphins) defensive tackle, University of Illinois defensive tackle
 Joe Stanley, retired U.S. Air Force colonel, commander of Eglin Air Force Base during 1950s
 Danny Wuerffel, 1996 Heisman Trophy winner for Florida and quarterback for New Orleans Saints

Economy

The economy of Fort Walton Beach is driven by two primary factors: tourism and the military. There are two major Air Force bases which border Fort Walton Beach. Hurlburt Field is home to Headquarters, Air Force Special Operations Command (AFSOC), the 1st Special Operations Wing, and the Joint Special Operations University. Eglin AFB is home to the Air Force Materiel Command's Air Armament Center and the 96th Air Base Wing, the 46th Test Wing, and Air Combat Command's 33rd Fighter Wing. For example, the 'Massive Ordnance Air Blast' or 'Mother of All Bombs' (MOAB) was first tested at Eglin AFB on March 11, 2003.

There is support industry in the area that benefits from the presence of the bases, including military contractors and the service industry. 

The tourism industry is seasonal, with summer being the primary season, and a smaller peak season during spring break.  The area also boasts a large snowbird population, which includes the Fort Walton Beach Snowbird Club.  The Billy Bowlegs Pirate Festival is held annually in June.

Top employers
According to Fort Walton Beach's 2010 Comprehensive Annual Financial Report, the top employers in the city were:

Sister cities
 Quezon City, Philippines (since October 1977)

Notes

References

External links

 City of Fort Walton Beach Official website
 Local Boating Events and Information
 The Beachcomber Newspaper
 Northwest Florida Daily News

 
Cities in Okaloosa County, Florida
Populated places on the Intracoastal Waterway in Florida
Beaches of Florida
Populated places established in 1941
Cities in Florida
Beaches of Okaloosa County, Florida
1941 establishments in Florida